Anwesha is an annual cultural festival of Indian Institute of Technology Patna. It is a three-day-long event usually held towards the end of January every year.

The fest hosts cultural, literary, ecological and management events. The first edition of Anwesha took place in 2008. It draws a footfall of about 35,000 from more than 200 colleges across the country.

Management events such as Stock Mart, B-quiz, Vendre and ecological events like Eco-debate, Green quiz give participants ample scope to showcase their talents. Anwesha enjoys a cult status among the youths of Bihar. Eminent personalities such as chief minister Nitish Kumar, Padma Vibhushan, G. Madhavan Nair, Ravindra Kumar Sinha (the Dolphin Man of India), have been part of Anwesha in the past.

The theme for the 2019 edition of the festival was The Impeccable Showman's Odyssey.

Introduction
The event name is derived from the Sanskrit word Anwesha, meaning quest. The first took place in March, 2010 with the aim of helping students gain experience and providing them with a showcase. It was opened by Bihar Chief Minister Nitish Kumar and featured a Hindi rock band comprising IITP students.

The 2011 event was the first to have a corporate co-sponsor: Reliance Communications supported its Pro-Night featuring Sifar.

The involvement of the Campus Ambassador Program for the 2014 event saw the event reach beyond the city of Patna to 200 colleges across India. A total of 52 events were organised, with 17 technical events, 13 cultural events, 9 ecological events and 7 literary events. Six new management events were also introduced in 2014 edition.

The tenth event is scheduled to take place from 1–3 February 2019.

Events
Over the years, pro-nights have starred various artists, rock bands and personalities. These have included the rock bands Sifar (2011), Swarathma (2015) and Euphoria (2016), together with classical music performances from the likes of Kamala Shankar (2012) and Priya Venkataraman (2013). The most famous poet Dr. Kumar Vishwas performed in 2012.

Other attendees have included an audience with Miss India International 2013 Gurleen Grewal (2014) and Miss India Earth 2013 Sobhita Dhulipala (2015).

Interactive sessions

Structure 
Anwesha is an entirely student-run non-profit organization composed of students from over 10 departments selected through several rounds of interviews and appraisal of work history.

The entire team is divided into committees - Events, Sponsorship & Marketing, Web & App, and Hospitality to name a few. For instance the Events committee focuses on ideation, formulation and on-site execution of all the events, workshops, and lectures conducted throughout the fest. On the other hand a committee like Web & App would cater to all the technological necessities associated with the same. Each committee further consists of a panel of Coordinators from the Junior Year followed by a group of Sub-Coordinators from the Sophomore Year.

First Years form the Volunteers team where they get introduced to various aspects of event management. The Previous Year’s Core Team act as an Advisory Committee and are responsible for guidance and support over important issues.

The Fest Coordinator ( or FC ) from the Junior Year is the overall incharge and is responsible for gluing together all the committees.

Guests

References

External links
 

Indian Institutes of Technology festivals
Entertainment events in India
Technical festivals in India
2008 establishments in Bihar
Festivals established in 2008